Cool Breeze may refer to any of the following:

Cool Breeze (rapper), born 1971
Cool Breeze (film), 1972 MGM blaxploitation film
Cool Breeze (real name Roger Williams), a member of Ken Kesey's Merry Pranksters featured in the 1968 Tom Wolfe book The Electric Kool-Aid Acid Test
Cool Breeze, callsign of fictional character Bob Brown (The Unit)